The 2016–17 Oregon Ducks men's basketball team represented the University of Oregon during the 2016–17 NCAA Division I men's basketball season. The Ducks were led by seventh year head coach Dana Altman. They played their home games at Matthew Knight Arena as members of the Pac–12 Conference. They finished the season 33–6, 16–2 in Pac-12 play to win a share of the regular season Pac-12 championship. They defeated Arizona State and California in the Pac-12 tournament before losing in the final to Arizona. They received an at-large bid to the NCAA tournament where they defeated Iona, Rhode Island, Michigan, and Kansas to advance to the Final Four, marking the longest span between appearances in NCAA history (78 years), where they lost to the eventual champions  North Carolina.

Previous season

The Ducks finished the 2015–16 season 31–7, 14–4 in Pac-12 play to win the regular season conference championship. As the No. 1 seed in the Pac–12 Tournament, the Ducks defeated Washington, Arizona, and Utah to win the Pac-12 Tournament championship and earn the conference's automatic bid to the NCAA tournament. As a No. 1 seed in the West Region, they defeated Holy Cross, Saint Joseph's, and Duke to advance to the Elite Eight. There they lost to Oklahoma.

Off-season

Departures

Incoming transfers

2016 recruiting class

2017 Recruiting class

Roster

Schedule and results

|-
!colspan=12 style=| Exhibition

|-
!colspan=12 style=| Non-conference regular season

|-
!colspan=12 style=| Pac-12 regular season

|-
!colspan=12 style=| Pac-12 Tournament

|-
!colspan=12 style=| NCAA tournament

Ranking movement

*AP does not release post-NCAA tournament rankings

References

Oregon Ducks men's basketball seasons
Oregon
Oregon
NCAA Division I men's basketball tournament Final Four seasons
Oregon
Oregon Ducks men's basketball